The Journal of Logical and Algebraic Methods in Programming is a peer-reviewed scientific journal established in 1984. It was originally titled The Journal of Logic Programming; in 2001 it was renamed The Journal of Logic and Algebraic Programming, and in 2014 it obtained its current title.

The founding editor-in-chief was J. Alan Robinson. From 1984 to 2000 it was the official journal of the Association of Logic Programming. In 2000, the association and the then editorial board started a new journal under the name Theory and Practice of Logic Programming, published by Cambridge University Press. Elsevier continued the journal with a new editorial board under the title Journal of Logic and Algebraic Programming.

According to the Journal Citation Reports, the journal has a 2013 impact factor of 0.383.

See also

References

External links 

 The Journal of Logic and Algebraic Programming

Publications established in 1984
Computer science journals
Elsevier academic journals
English-language journals
Bimonthly journals